Battle of Bauds was a battle fought in 962 in an area known as the Bauds, south of Findochty and west of Cullen near Portknockie, Scotland between Scotland, under King Indulf, and Norse pirates. The Vikings had been raiding and burning through Scotland, and had won numerous skirmishes against the Scots, including the Battle of Dollar. However, in this battle, the Norsemen were defeated. Afterwards, Norse control in Scotland fell apart. However, Indulf was killed in the battle.

References

Notes

Sources
George Bruce. Harbottle's Dictionary of Battles. (Van Nostrand Reinhold, 1981).

W. CRAMOND; NOTES ON TUMULI IN CULLEN DISTRICT; AND NOTICE OF THE DISCOVERY OF TWO URNS AT FOULFORD, NEAR CULLEN (1897) Retrieved 29-12-2010

960s conflicts
962
10th century in Scotland
Battles involving Scotland
Battles involving Denmark
History of Moray